The Heinkel HD 30 was a biplane reconnaissance seaplane developed by Ernst Heinkel Flugzeugwerke.

Development 
The Heinkel HD 30 was similar in layout to the Heinkel HD 19, but differed from the latter in being larger and having a Gnome-Rhône 9Ak Jupiter VI engine. It was intended to be launched from a steam-powered catapult mounted on small- and medium-sized ships.

Specifications

References

1920s German military reconnaissance aircraft
HD 30
Single-engined tractor aircraft
Biplanes
Aircraft first flown in 1928